Osvaldo Borsani (1911-1985) was an Italian architect and furniture designer.

References

1911 births
1985 deaths
20th-century Italian architects
Italian furniture designers